Beau Brocade is a 1916 British silent adventure film directed by Thomas Bentley and starring Mercy Hatton, Charles Rock and Austin Leigh. In eighteenth century Britain a disgraced gentlemen becomes a highwaymen. It is adapted from the 1907 novel Beau Brocade by Baroness Emmuska Orczy.

Cast
 Mercy Hatton - Lady Patience
 Charles Rock - Sir Humphrey Challoner
 Austin Leigh - Jack Bathurst
 Cecil Mannering - Lord Stretton
 George Foley - John Stitch
 Cecil Morton York - Matterchip
 Frank Harris - Jock Miggs
 Harry Brayne - Duffy
 Kitty Arlington - Betty

References

External links
 

1916 films
British historical adventure films
British silent feature films
Films directed by Thomas Bentley
1910s historical adventure films
Films based on British novels
British black-and-white films
1910s British films
Silent historical adventure films